Ivan Ivanovich Edeshko (born March 25, 1945 in Stetski village, Hrodna Voblast, Byelorussian SSR) is a retired Belarusian professional basketball player and coach.

Club career
During his club career, Edeshko trained at the Armed Forces sports society, in Moscow. He spent most of his career with CSKA Moscow.

Soviet national team
Edeshko won a gold medal with the senior Soviet national team at the 1972 Summer Olympics. In the gold medal game against the American national team, Edeshko's full-court length inbound pass led to Alexander Belov's game-winning basket with no time left on the game clock. The game's final score was 51–50.

References

External links
 Biography
 CSKAlogia.com profile 

1945 births
Living people
People from Hrodna District
Armed Forces sports society athletes
Basketball players at the 1972 Summer Olympics
Basketball players at the 1976 Summer Olympics
FIBA EuroBasket-winning players
Medalists at the 1972 Summer Olympics
Medalists at the 1976 Summer Olympics
Olympic basketball players of the Soviet Union
Olympic bronze medalists for the Soviet Union
Olympic gold medalists for the Soviet Union
Olympic medalists in basketball
PBC CSKA Moscow coaches
PBC CSKA Moscow players
Point guards
Belarusian men's basketball players
Soviet men's basketball players
1974 FIBA World Championship players
1978 FIBA World Championship players
Soviet basketball coaches
Honoured Coaches of Russia
Merited Coaches of the Soviet Union
FIBA World Championship-winning players
Spartak athletes
Sportspeople from Grodno Region